Oxychloe is a genus of plants in family Juncaceae described as a genus in 1860.

The genus is native to the Andes of South America.

 species
 Oxychloe andina Phil. - Bolivia, Peru, NW Argentina, N Chile
 Oxychloe bisexualis Kuntze - W Argentina, N Chile
 Oxychloe castellanosii Barros - San Juan + La Rioja Provinces of Argentina
 Oxychloe haumaniana (Barros) Barros - San Juan Province of Argentina
 Oxychloe mendocina Barros - Mendoza Province of Argentina

 formerly included
moved to Patosia 
 Oxychloe brevifolia (Phil.) Buchenau - Patosia clandestina (Phil.) Buchenau
 Oxychloe clandestina (Buchenau) Hauman - Patosia clandestina (Phil.) Buchenau

References

Juncaceae
Poales genera